Classic Ethernet is a family of 10 Mbit/s Ethernet standards, which is the first generation of Ethernet standards. In 10BASE-X, the 10 represents its maximum throughput of 10 Mbit/s, BASE indicates its use of baseband transmission, and X indicates the type of medium used.

Varieties

Fibre-based standards (10BASE-F) 
10BASE-F, or sometimes 10BASE-FX, is a generic term for the family of 10 Mbit/s Ethernet standards using fiber optic cable. In 10BASE-F, the 10 represents a maximum throughput of 10 Mbit/s, BASE indicates its use of baseband transmission, and F indicates that it relies on a medium of fiber-optic cable. The technical standard requires two strands of 62.5/125 µm multimode fiber. One strand is used for data transmission while the other is used for reception, making 10BASE-F a full-duplex technology. There a three different variants of 10BASE-F: 10BASE-FL, 10BASE-FB and 10BASE-FP. Of these only 10BASE-FL experienced widespread use. With the introduction of later standards 10 Mbit/s technology has been largely replaced by faster Fast Ethernet, Gigabit Ethernet and 100 Gigabit Ethernet standards.

FOIRL 
Fiber-optic inter-repeater link (FOIRL) is a specification of Ethernet over optical fiber. It was specially designed as a back-to-back transport between repeater hubs to decrease latency and collision detection time, thus increasing the possible network radius. It was replaced by 10BASE-FL.

10BASE-FL 
10BASE-FL is the most commonly used 10BASE-F specification of Ethernet over optical fiber. In 10BASE-FL, FL stands for fiber optic link. It replaces the original fiber-optic inter-repeater link (FOIRL) specification, but retains compatibility with FOIRL-based equipment. When mixed with FOIRL equipment, the maximum segment length is limited to FOIRL's 1000 meters.

10BASE-FB 
The 10BASE-FB is a network segment used to bridge Ethernet hubs. Here FB abbreviates FiberBackbone. Due to the synchronous operation of 10BASE-FB, delays normally associated with Ethernet repeaters are reduced, thus allowing segment distances to be extended without compromising the collision detection mechanism. The maximum allowable segment length for 10BASE-FB is 2000 meters. This media system allowed multiple half-duplex Ethernet signal repeaters to be linked in series, exceeding the limit on the total number of repeaters that could be used in a given 10 Mbit/s Ethernet system. 10BASE-FB links were attached to synchronous signaling repeater hubs and used to link the hubs together in a half-duplex repeated backbone system that could span longer distances.

10BASE-FP 
In 10BASE-FP, FP denotes fibre passive. This variant calls for a non-powered optical signal coupler capable of linking up to 33 devices, with each segment being up to 500 m in length. This formed a star network centered on the signal coupler. There are no devices known to have implemented this standard.

References 

Ethernet standards